Lim Young-sueb (born December 5, 1973 in Seoul) is a South Korean sport shooter. He competed in rifle shooting events at the Summer Olympics in 1996 and 2000.

Olympic results

References

1973 births
Living people
ISSF rifle shooters
South Korean male sport shooters
Olympic shooters of South Korea
Shooters at the 1996 Summer Olympics
Shooters at the 2000 Summer Olympics
Asian Games medalists in shooting
Asian Games bronze medalists for South Korea
Shooters at the 2002 Asian Games
Medalists at the 2002 Asian Games
20th-century South Korean people
21st-century South Korean people